Zhang Shuang (born 10 September 1986) is a Chinese long-track speed skater. She competed for China at the 2010 Winter Olympics in the women's 500 m.

Personal records

References

1986 births
Living people
Chinese female speed skaters
Olympic speed skaters of China
Speed skaters at the 2006 Winter Olympics
Speed skaters at the 2010 Winter Olympics
Speed skaters at the 2014 Winter Olympics
Asian Games medalists in speed skating
Asian Games bronze medalists for China
Speed skaters at the 2007 Asian Winter Games
Medalists at the 2007 Asian Winter Games
Universiade medalists in speed skating
Universiade silver medalists for China
Universiade bronze medalists for China
Competitors at the 2009 Winter Universiade
Sportspeople from Heilongjiang
20th-century Chinese women
21st-century Chinese women